Neolucanus is a genus of beetles belonging to the family Lucanidae.

The species of this genus are found in Southeastern Asia.

Species:

Neolucanus armatus 
Neolucanus baladeva 
Neolucanus baongocae

References

Lucanidae
Lucanidae genera